Maren Hassinger (born Maren Louise Jenkins in 1947) is an African-American artist and educator whose career spans four decades. Hassinger uses sculpture, film, dance, performance art, and public art to explore the relationship between the natural world and industrial materials. She incorporates everyday materials in her art, like wire rope,  plastic bags, branches, dirt, newspaper, garbage, leaves, and cardboard boxes. Hassinger has stated that her work “focuses on elements, or even problems—social and environmental—that we all share, and in which we all have a stake…. I want it to be a humane and humanistic statement about our future together.”

Trained in dance, Hassinger transitioned to making sculpture and visual art in college. Hassinger received her MFA in Fiber Arts from UCLA in 1973. She was the director emeritus of the Rinehart School of Sculpture at the Maryland Institute College of Art for ten years. She currently lives and works in New York City.

Early life 
In 1947, Maren Louise Jenkins was born in Los Angeles, California, to Helen Mills Jenkins, a police officer and educator, and late father, Carey Kenneth Jenkins, an architect. At an early age, she showed a gift for art and was exposed to both her mother's interest in flower arranging and her father's work at his drafting table.

Education 
In 1965, she enrolled at Bennington College and graduated with a Bachelor of Arts in sculpture in 1969. She originally intended to study dance, which she had practiced since she was five years old, at Bennington. Instead, she sought to incorporate aspects of dance into her sculptures.

During Hassinger's years at Bennington College, the institution was an all-women's college with mostly men serving as instructors, many of whom had New York gallery affiliations. Hassinger believed the institutional connections and affiliations of the instructors were distant from the experiences of many students, and she rejected the formal strategies that were being taught. In an essay on Hassinger's practice, Maureen Megerian wrote:". . . Clement Greenberg's formalist approach dominated the art department, so instructors focused on the creation of abstract, Constructivist-inspired welded steel sculpture. Minimalism, then predominant in the New York art world, presented another model of formulaic, abstract art for students to follow. [Hassinger] ultimately rejected such strict formal strategies, although the discipline of these methods, especially such Minimalist devices as repetition and regular arrangement, provides her work with a rational underpinning that she consciously complicates and makes more emotionally engaging."She earned a Master of Fine Arts in fiber from UCLA in 1973. Hassinger discovered the wire rope in a Los Angeles junkyard while a student in the graduate program. This became a signature medium for her.

Mid-life 
In 1969, she moved to New York City to enroll in drafting courses and concurrently work as an art editor at a publishing company. As an editor, she managed the inclusion of African-American images in textbooks, "...a position she has described as 'demeaning." Jenkins married writer Peter Hassinger and returned to Los Angeles with her husband in 1970.

From 1984-1985, Hassinger worked at the Studio Museum in Harlem as an artist-in-residence.

During the 1980s, the League of Allied Arts sponsored the musical Ain't Misbehavin honoring various Black artists. The League of Allied Arts is the longest running Black women's arts nonprofit arts organization in the Los Angeles area. The musical took place at the Aquarius Theatre in Hollywood and Hassinger was among the several honored artists.

Career and influences 
Maren Hassinger started her artistic experimentation in a Los Angeles junkyard in the early 1970s, where she came across bulks of industrial wire rope. She found that the material could be used sculpturally and as a fiber that could be manipulated to resemble plant life. It was during this period in the 1970s that Hassinger began to collaborate with the sculptor Senga Nengudi. Incorporating both sculptural and performance work, their collaborative sculptures have been considered ahead of their time due to their process of "combin[ing] sculpture, dance, theater, music and more with the collaborative spirit of community meetings and the avant-garde brio of Allan Kaprow's happenings." Additionally, Hassinger utilizes movements of everyday life in her dance.

While few of their works from the 1970s remain, Hassinger and Nengudi continue to collaborate, with Hassinger activating Nengudi's sculpture R.S.V.P.X as recently as 2014.

Southern fiction writer Walker Percy continued to influence her childhood connection between the natural and the manufactured world with his work, Wreath. Many of Percy's novels, which Hassinger was reading at the time, are about navigating a modern world that was becoming removed from nature. Another influence which struck her was the sculpture work of Eva Hesse. During an exhibition at the Pasadena Art Museum in 1973 Hassinger was introduced to Hesse's work and admired her obsessive exploration of forms and techniques, and ability to convey emotion through fiber methods. Hassinger recalled:     "It was as if I was looking at somebody's spirit made manifest. . . it was an absolute gut level, wrenching experience. . . as if the sculpture were made flesh. . . later when I began to read about [Eva Hesse], it was as if she had managed somehow to put all the emotional truth of her life into that piece, and it communicated that way. . . It was a total true expression of life."

Films 
Through moving videos, Hassinger has explored personal family interactions and her own family history to tackle themes of identity. Her daughter, Ava Hassinger, is also an artist. The two have produced a video in which they perform improvisational choreography together under the title "Matriarch." In 2004, Daily Mask, which is a 16mm film transferred to video, was made. It depicts Hassinger acting out her personal story and references back to an African past through associations to sculpture, art/cultural history, and feminist issues.

Themes 
Hassinger's work has been described as "ecological," but Hassinger herself does not see her work as such. Rather, she aims to produce humanistic statements about society and its commonalities. She unveils how meaningless cultural stereotyping is due to the way it establishes racial and social barriers and buries away the similarities and parallels that exists between people. Moreover, Hassinger remains adamant on having contemporaneous conversations in regards to race and gender. Additionally, Hassinger has addressed issues of equality with works like Love, a display made of hundreds of pink plastic bags, each containing a love note. Such pieces exemplify how she is able to evoke beauty and themes about society using everyday, common materials.

Educator 
From 1997 until 2017, she was the Director of the Rinehart School of Sculpture at the Maryland Institute College of Art. Hassinger was an adjunct professor at Stony Brook University for five years.

Works 
 Twelve Trees #2, Mulholland Drive off-ramp, San Diego Freeway, northbound, Los Angeles, CA, 1979
Leaning, 1980
On Dangerous Ground, 1981
Pink Trash, Lynwood, CA, 1982
 Necklace of Trees, Atlanta Festival for the Arts, Atlanta, GA, 1985-85
 Bushes at Socrates Sculpture Park, Socrates Sculpture Park, Astoria, Queens, NY, 1988 
 Plaza Planters and Tree Grates, Commissions for Downtown Seattle Transit Project, Seattle, WA, 1986–90
Field, Nasher Sculpture Center, 1989
 Tall Grasses, Roosevelt Island, New York, NY, 1989-90
 Circle of Bushes, for C. W. Post, Long Island University, Brookville, NY, 1991
 Cloud Room, Commission for the Greater Pittsburgh International Airport, Pittsburgh, PA, 1992
 Evening Shadows, University Art Museum, California State University, Long Beach, CA, 1993
 Window Boxes, Whitney Museum at Philip Morris, NY, 1993
 Fence of Leaves, P.S. 8, NY, 1995
 Ancestor Walk, Commission for the New York City Department of Cultural Affairs, 1996
 Art in the Garden, Grant Park, Chicago, IL, 2004-5
Tree of Knowledge, 2019

A subway station in New York City, the Central Park North – 110th Street (IRT Lenox Avenue Line) station, installed a work titled Message from Malcolm by Hassinger during a 1998 renovation. The work consists of mosaic panels on the platform and the main fare control area's street stairs depicting quotes and writings by Malcolm Xwritten in script and surrounded by mosaic borders.

Collections 
Hassinger has work held in the permanent collections of Hammer Museum, Los Angeles, CA; Reginald F. Lewis Museum of Maryland African American History and Culture, Baltimore, MD; California African American Museum, Los Angeles, CA; Portland Museum of Art, Portland, OR; The Studio Museum in Harlem, New York, NY; Williams College Art Museum, Williamstown, MA; San Francisco Museum of Modern Art, San Francisco, CA; the Museum of Modern Art, New York, NY.

Awards and honors 
 Lifetime Achievement Award from the Women’s Caucus for Art, Maryland Institute College of Art (2009)
Grants, Joan Mitchell Foundation (1996)
Anonymous Was a Woman (1997)
Pollock-Krasner Foundation (2007)

Selected exhibitions
Maren Hassinger's work has been featured in exhibitions at numerous galleries and institutions including the following solo exhibitions:
 Oklahoma Contemporary Nature, Sweet Nature 2021
 The Studio Museum in Harlem, New York, NY., Maren Hassinger: Monuments, (2018-2019). Site specific works that are located in Marcus Garvey Park.
 Spelman College Museum of Fine Art, Atlanta, Georgia, USA Maren Hassinger: A Retrospective (2015)
 Reginald Ingraham Gallery, Los Angeles, California, USA Maren Hassinger (2014)
 Spelman College Museum of Fine Art, Atlanta, Georgia, USA Maren Hassinger . . . Dreaming (2013)
 Schmucker Gallery, Gettysburg, PA, USA Maren Hassinger: Lives (2010)
 Contemporary Arts Forum and Alice Keck Park, Santa Barbara, CA., Blanket of Branches and Dancing Branches, (1986)
 Los Angeles County Museum of Art, Los Angeles, CA., Gallery Six: Maren Hassinger, (1981)
 Just Above Midtown/Downtown Gallery, New York, NY., Beach, (1980)

Selected group exhibitions include:
 Brooklyn Museum, Brooklyn, NY, We Wanted A Revolution: Black Radical Women 1965-85 (2017)
 Contemporary Arts Museum Houston, Houston, Texas, USA Radical Presence: Black Performance in Contemporary Art (2012)
 Havana Biennial, Cinema Remixed and Reloaded 2.0,  (2012)
 Hammer Museum, Los Angeles, California, USA Now Dig This!: Art of Black Los Angeles 1960 –1980 (2011)
 Institute of Contemporary Art, Boston, MA., Dance/Draw,  (2011)
 Spelman College Museum of Fine Art, Atlanta, Georgia, USA Material Girls: Contemporary Black Women Artists (2011)
 The Studio Museum in Harlem, New York, NY., VideoStudio: Playback,  (2011)
 Reginald F. Lewis Museum, Baltimore, MD., Material Girls, (2011)
 Museum of Arts and Design, New York, NY, Global Africa Project,  (2010)
 The Studio Museum in Harlem, New York, NY., 30 Seconds off an Inch, (2009)

References

External links 
 Maren Hassinger - Portfolio, Official site

1947 births
American contemporary artists
African-American contemporary artists
Living people
20th-century American women artists
Bennington College alumni
University of California, Los Angeles alumni
Artists from Los Angeles
Maryland Institute College of Art faculty
American women academics
21st-century American artists
21st-century American women artists
20th-century African-American women
20th-century African-American artists
21st-century African-American women
21st-century African-American artists